The Guiyang–Kaiyang intercity railway is a higher-speed railway within Guizhou province, connecting the provincial capital of Guiyang to Kaiyang.

History
Works on this project started on September 20, 2010, with construction completed by October 28, 2014. December 16, 2014, saw commencement of testing and safety checks on the line. On May 1, 2015, the project was opened to the public and revenue operations commenced.

Stations

References

High-speed railway lines in China
Standard gauge railways in China
Rail transport in Guizhou
Guiyang
Railway lines opened in 2015